Euthalia whiteheadi  is a butterfly of the family Nymphalidae (Limenitidinae). It is found in the Indomalayan realm.<ref>[http://ftp.funet.fi/pub/sci/bio/life/insecta/lepidoptera/ditrysia/papilionoidea/nymphalidae/limenitidinae/euthalia/ " Euthalia  " Hübner, [1819"] at Markku Savela's Lepidoptera and Some Other Life Forms</ref>
SubspeciesE. w. whiteheadi BorneoE. w. mariae Fruhstorfer, 1904  Thailand, Peninsular Malaya, SumatraE. w. culminicola'' Fruhstorfer, 1894  Java

References

Butterflies described in 1889
whiteheadi